The Insurgency in Northeast India involves multiple armed separatist factions operating in some of India's northeastern states, which are connected to the rest of India by the Siliguri Corridor, a strip of land as narrow as  wide.

Northeastern India consists of seven states (also known as the Seven Sister States): Assam, Meghalaya, Tripura, Arunachal Pradesh, Mizoram, Manipur, and Nagaland. Tensions existed between insurgents in these states and the central government as well as amongst their native indigenous people and migrants from other parts of India and illegal immigrants. Government of India claims that Insurgency has seen rapid decline in recent years, with a 70 per cent reduction in insurgency incidents and an 80 per cent drop in civilian deaths in the Northeast in 2019 compared to 2013.

The 2014 Indian general election had an 80% voter turnout in all northeastern states, the highest among all states of India according to Indian government. Indian authorities claim that this shows the faith of the northeastern people in Indian democracy. Indian Chief of Defence Staff Gen Anil Chauhan then Eastern Army Commander claimed that as of 2020, the area of violence in the entire North-East has shrunk primarily to an area which is the tri-junction between Assam, Arunachal Pradesh and north Nagaland.

Mizoram

Mizo uprising (1966)

MNF insurgency (1966-1986)  
Mizoram's tensions were largely due to the simmering Assamese domination and the neglect of the Mizo people. In 1986, the Mizo accord ended the main secessionist movement led by the Mizo National Front, bringing peace to the region. Insurgency status is classified as partially active, due to secessionist/autonomy demands by the Chakmas and Brus. The Chakma and Reang tribes complain of religious and ethnic persecution, and complain that the dominant Mizo ethnic group, almost entirely Christian, wants to convert them to Christianity.

Manipur 

Manipur's long tradition of independence can be traced to the foundation of the Kangleipak State in 1110. The Kingdom of Manipur was conquered by Great Britain following the brief Anglo-Manipuri War of 1891, becoming a British protectorate.

Manipur became part of the Indian Union on 15 October 1949. Manipur's incorporation into the Indian state soon led to the formation of a number of insurgent organisations, seeking the creation of an independent state within the borders of Manipur, and dismissing the merger with India as involuntary.

Despite the fact that Manipur became a separate state of the Indian Union on 21 January 1972, the insurgency continued.
On 8 September 1980, Manipur was declared an area of disturbance, when the Indian government imposed the Armed Forces (Special Powers) Act, 1958 on the region; the act currently remains in force.

The parallel rise of Naga nationalism in neighbouring Nagaland led to the emergence of the National Socialist Council of Nagaland (NSCN) activities in Manipur. Clashes between the Isak-Muivah and Khaplang factions of the NSCN further aggravated tensions, as Kuki tribals began creating their own guerrilla groups in order to protect their interests from alleged Naga violations. Skirmishes between the two ethnic groups took place during the 1990s. Other ethnic groups such as the Paite, Vaiphei, Pangals and Hmars followed suit establishing militant groups. 

The Kuki National Army also maintains one armed wing in Manipur.

UNLF (1964-present) 
The first separatist faction known as the United National Liberation Front (UNLF) was founded on 24 November 1964.

Marxist & Maoist groups (1977-present) 
Between 1977 and 1980, the People's Liberation Army of Manipur (PLA), the People's Revolutionary Party of Kangleipak (PREPAK) and the Kangleipak Communist Party (KCP), were formed, immediately joining the war.

Nagaland 

Nagaland was created in 1963 as the 16th state of the Indian Union, before which it was a district of Assam. Active Naga-Kuki insurgent groups mainly demand full independence. The Naga National Council led by Phizo was the first group to dissent in 1947 and in 1956 they went underground.

NSCN insurgency (1980-present)  
The National Socialist Council of Nagaland was formed in 1980 to establish a Greater Nagaland, encompassing parts of Manipur, Nagaland, and the north Cachar hills (Assam). The NSCN split in 1988 to form two groups, NSCN(IM) and NSCN(K). As of 2015, both groups have observed a ceasefire truce with the Indian government.

The National Socialist Council of Nagaland—Khaplang is the second faction with the same aim of a Greater Nagaland and was formed in 1988.

Tripura (1978-2019) 

 
The insurgent groups in Tripura emerged at the end of the 1970s, as ethnic tensions between perceived Bangladeshi infiltration and the tribal native population who were outnumbered by the former, hailing from other parts of India and nearby Bangladesh, which resulted in their being reduced to minority status even threatening them economically, socially, culturally; this resulted in a clarion call for safeguarding tribal rights and cultures. Such being the extent of desperation, this naturally resulted in hatred and suspicion and their status is classified as active.

The first militant outfit to form was Tripura National Volunteers (TNV), which was active until 1988. 

The National Liberation Front of Tripura was formed in March 1989. During the period 1992 to 2001, a total of 764 civilians and 184 members of the security forces were killed in NLFT attacks. In 2019, it signed the Tripura Peace Accord to end the insurgency.

The All Tripura Tiger Force was formed by local aboriginal tribes in 1990, who were gradually outnumbered both directly and indirectly, even at the cost of being threatened for their survival 
economically and culturally, not to speak of their being reduced to minority population-wise; their sole aim is the expulsion of all Bangladeshi infiltration nearby Bangladesh.

Assam 

Assam has been a refuge for militants for a number of years, due to its porous borders with Bangladesh and Bhutan and also due to its very close proximity to Burma. The main causes of the friction include anti-foreigner agitation in the 1980s, and the simmering indigenous-migrant tensions. The government of Bangladesh has arrested and extradited senior leaders of the ULFA.

Bodoland 
BLTF (1996-2003): The Bodo Liberation Tigers Force fought for autonomy of Bodoland under Prem Singh Brahma. It surrendered with the establishment of Bodoland Territorial Council.
NDFB (1986-2020): The National Democratic Front of Bodoland (NDFB) was formed in 1986 as the Bodo Security Force, and aims to set up an independent nation of Bodoland.

ULFA (1990-present) 

The United Liberation Front of Assam was formed in April 1979 to establish a sovereign state of Assam for the indigenous people of Assam through an armed struggle. In recent times the organisation has lost its middle rung leaders after most of them were arrested.

KLO (1995-present)  
The objective of the Kamtapur Liberation Organisation (KLO) is to carve out a separate Kamtapur Nation. The proposed state is to comprise six districts in West Bengal and four contiguous districts of Assam which are Cooch Behar, Darjeeling, Jalpaiguri, North and South Dinajpur and Malda of West Bengal and four contiguous districts of Assam – Kokrajhar, Bongaigaon, Dhubri and Goalpara. The KLO, in the beginning, was an unconcealed organisation, which was formed to address problems of the Koch Rajbongshi people, such as large-scale unemployment, land alienation, perceived neglect of Kamtapuri language, identity, and grievances of economic deprivation.

Meghalaya 

The state of Meghalaya was separated from the state of Assam in 1971, in order to satisfy the Khasi, Synteng and Garo for a separate state. The decision was initially praised as an example of successful national integration into the wider Indian state.

This, however, failed to prevent the rise of national consciousness among the local tribal populations, later leading to a direct confrontation between Indian nationalism and the newly created Garo and Khasi nationalisms. A parallel rise of nationalism in the other members of the Seven Sister States further complicated the situation, resulting in occasional clashes between rebel groups.

The state wealth distribution system further fueled the rising separatist movements, as funding is practised through per-capita transfers, which largely benefits the leading ethnic group.

The first militant outfit to emerge in the region was the Hynniewtrep Achik Liberation Council (HALC). It was formed in 1992, aiming to protect the interests of Meghalaya's indigenous population from the rise of non-tribal ("Dkhar") immigration.

A conflict of interest soon led to a split of the HALC. The Garo members formed the Achik Matgrik Liberation Army (AMLA) while the joint Jaintia-Khasi alliance of Hynniewtrep National Liberation Council (HNLC) was formed in 1993. The HNLC claims to represent the Khasi - Jaintia people, and its aim is to free Meghalaya from the alleged domination of the Garos and the outsiders (the "Dkhars"). 

The AMLA passed into obscurity, while the Achik National Volunteers Council (ANVC) took its place. The Garo-Khasi drift persisted as the HNLC had set up the goal of turning Meghalaya into an exclusively Khasi region; the ANVC, on the other hand, sought the creation of an independent state in the Garo Hills. 

A number of non-Meghalayan separatist groups have also operated in the region, including the United Liberation Front of Assam and the National Democratic Front of Bodoland among others.

GNLA insurgency (2010-present) 
The most active outfit in the state is the Garo National Liberation Army (GNLA), which was formed in 2009.

Other insurgent groups

In Assam 
UPDS (2004-2014): The United People's Democratic Solidarity was formed in March 1999 with the merger of two groups in Assam's Karbi Anglong district, the Karbi National Volunteers (KNV) and the Karbi People’s Front (KPF). In 2004, the UPDS (Anti-Talks) renamed itself as the Karbi Longri North Cachar Hills Liberation Front (KLNLF), and its armed wing as the Karbi Longri North Cachar Hills Resistance Force (KNPR). In December 2014, the UPDS disbanded, following the mass surrender of all it cadres and leaders. 

KLNLF (2004-2021): The Karbi Longri N.C. Hills Liberation Front is a militant group operating in the Karbi Anglong and Dima Hasao districts of Assam that was formed on 16 May 2004. The outfit claims to fight for the cause of Karbi tribes, and its declared objective is Hemprek Kangthim, meaning self-rule/self-determination of the Karbi people. It is closely linked with the ULFA (United Liberation Front of Assam)

DHD (1995-2009): The Dima Halam Daoga (DHD) is a descendant of the Dimasa National Security Force (DNSF), which ceased operations in 1995. Commander-in-Chief Jewel Gorlosa, refused to surrender and launched the Dima Halam Daogah. After the peace agreement between the DHD and the central government in the year 2003, the group further broke out and DHD(J) also known as Black Widow was born which was led by Jewel Gorlosa. The Black Widow's declared objective is to create Dimaraji nation for the Dimasa people in Dima Hasao only. However the objective of DHD (Nunisa faction) is to include parts of Cachar, Karbi Anglong, and Nagaon districts in Assam, and sections of Dimapur district in Nagaland. In 2009 the group surrendered en masse to the CRPF and local police, 193 cadres surrendering on 2009-09-12 and another 171 on the 13th.

MULTA (1996-present): The objective of the Muslim United Liberation Tigers of Assam (MULTA) is to establish an Islamic state in India under sharia law. The group composed of migrants and indigenous peoples who practiced Islam.

Hmar 
The Hmar People's Convention-Democracy (HPC-D) is an armed insurgency group formed in 1995 to create an independent Hmar State in North East India. It is the offspring of the Hmar People's Convention (HPC), which entered into an agreement with the Government of Mizoram in 1994 resulting in the formation of the Sinlung Hills Development Council (SHDC) in North Mizoram. Their recruited cadres are from the States where the Hmar people are spread – Assam, Manipur, Mizoram, Tripura and Meghalaya. The HPC(D) is demanding a separate administrative unit under the Sixth Schedule of the Constitution of India.

Taniland 

The National Liberation Council of Taniland (NLCT) was active along the Assam – Arunachal Pradesh border, and its members belong to the Tani groups of people which are demanding Taniland. The group enjoys no support from the local population of Arunachal Pradesh who are fiercely pro-India and the group is all but defunct now. The Tani groups are one of the ethnic groups of northeast India (variously known as Mising in Assam and Adi, Nyishi, Galo, Apatani, Tagin, in Arunachal Pradesh) in India as well as the Lhoba in China who live along the frontier of India.

Spillover in Bhutan 

Following the 1990 Operations Rhino and Bajrang, Assamese separatist groups relocated their camps to Bhutan. In 1996 the Bhutan government became aware of a large number of camps on its southern border with India. The camps were set up by four Assamese separatist movements: the ULFA, NDFB, Bodo Liberation Tigers Force (BLTF) and Kamtapur Liberation Organization (KLO). The camps also harboured separatists belonging to the National Socialist Council of Nagaland (NSCN) and the All Tripura Tiger Force (ATTF).

India then exerted diplomatic pressure on Bhutan, offering support in removing the rebel organisations from its soil. The government of Bhutan initially pursued a peaceful solution, opening dialogue with the militant groups on 1998. Five rounds of talks were held with ULFA, three rounds with DNFB, with KLO ignoring all invitations sent by the government. In June 2001 ULFA agreed to close down four of its camps; however, the Bhutanese government soon realized that the camps had simply been relocated.

By 2003 the talks had failed to produce any significant result. On 14 July 2003, military intervention was approved by the National Assembly. On 13 December 2003, the Bhutanese government issued a two-day ultimatum to the rebels. On 15 December 2003, after the ultimatum had expired, Operation All Clear – the first operation ever conducted by the Royal Bhutan Army – was launched.

By 3 January 2004, the Royal Bhutan Army had killed about 120 militants. They managed to capture several senior ULFA commanders. Large numbers of rebels fled to Bangladesh and India. Militants also were dislodged from all 30 camps and 35 observation posts, with the camps burned and razed to the ground.

Between 2008 and 2011, Royal Bhutan Police and Royal Bhutan Army personnel undertook numerous actions against alleged north Indian militants. Several firefights occurred while Bhutan military personnel were required to dispose of several explosive devices and destroyed a number of guerrilla camps.

Spillover in Myanmar  

The Indo-Burmese border was drawn over the homeland of many ethnic groups, such as the Mizos/Chins and the Nagas, with communities with strong ethnic ties living on both sides of the border. Several separatist groups have operated out of Myanmar, crossing into India via the porous border.  

India-Myanmar military cooperation dates back to the 1960s when the Tatmadaw intercepted Naga and Mizo rebels heading to China for training. Indian support for the pro-democracy movement in the 1980s had caused the Tatmadaw to stop their operations against the northeastern rebel groups.  

After the 2015 Manipur ambush, India conducted surgical strikes against NSCN-K camps inside Myanmar, and inflicted significant casualties.  

In February and June 2019, Indian army and the Burmese Tatmadaw carried out joint operations Sunrise and Sunrise II, targeting in co-ordination several militant groups along the Indo-Burma border including the Kamtapur Liberation Organisation (KLO), the NSCN-K, the United Liberation Front of Assam (I) and the National Democratic Front of Boroland (NDFB). In February, Burmese troops stormed the NSCN-K headquarters at Taga. The Indian army reciprocated by starting a major operation against the Arakan Army in south Mizoram.

Alliances

CorCom 
In Manipur the following militant groups have come together as the CorCOM which is a short name for Coordination Committee.

 Kangleipak Communist Party (KCP),
 Kanglei Yawol Kanna Lup (KYKL),
 People's Revolutionary Party of Kangleipak (PREPAK), People's Revolutionary Party of Kangleipak-Pro (PREPAK-Pro),
 Revolutionary People's Front (RPF)
 United National Liberation Front (UNLF)
 United People's Party of Kangleipak (UPPK)

CorCom is on the extremist organisations list of the Government of India, and is responsible for many bombings usually associated with Indian holidays and elections.

WESEA Forum 
Some of the above-mentioned militant groups have formed an alliance to fight against the governments of India, Bhutan and Myanmar. They use the term "Western Southeast Asia" (WESEA) to describe the region in which they operate: Northeast India, Bhutan, North Bengal and Myanmar. These groups include:

 The Kangleipak Communist Party (KCP), Kanglei Yawol Kanna Lup (KYKL), People's Revolutionary Party of Kangleipak (PREPAK), People's Revolutionary Party of Kangleipak-Pro (PREPAK-Pro), Revolutionary People's Front and United National Liberation Front of Manipur
 Hynniewtrep National Liberation Council of Meghalaya,
 Kamtapur Liberation Organization, which operates in Assam and North Bengal,
 United Liberation Front of Asom (ULFA)
 National Liberation Front of Tripura of Tripura.

United National Liberation Front of WESEA 

Nine militant groups of the northeast, including the NSCN (Khaplang) and the ULFA faction led by Paresh Baruah, have come together to form a new unified front known as UNLFW during a meeting held in Myanmar in early 2015. Besides the NSCN (K) and ULFA-Independent, other groups that participated in the meeting held at Taga in Sagaing division of Myanmar earlier this month were the Kangleipak Communist Party (KCP), Kanglei Yawol Kunna Lup (KYKL), the People’s Revolutionary Party of Kangleipak (PREPAK), the People’s Liberation Army (PLA), the United National Liberation Front (UNLF) and the National Democratic Front of Bodoland (Songbijit faction) (NDFB).

All Muslim United Liberation Forum of Assam 
The MULTA is said to be part of the AMULFA, an organization that rejects separatism in favor of sharia law.

Counter-insurgency 
In 1955, an order of the day from the then Chief of Army Staff Rajendrasinhji Jadeja to troops fighting insurgency in the north-east read,

Further reading 
 A. Lanunungsang Ao; From Phizo to Muivah: The Naga National Question; New Delhi 2002
 Blisters on their feet: tales of internally displaced persons in India's North East; Los Angeles [u.a.] 2008; 
 Dutta, Anuradha; Assam in the Freedom Movement; Calcutta 1991
 Hazarika, Sanjoy; Strangers of the Mist: Tales of War and Peace from India's Northeast; New Delhi u.a. 1994
 Horam, M.; Naga insurgency: the last thirty years; New Delhi 1988
 International Work Group for Indigenous Affairs (Hrsg.); The Naga nation and its struggle against genocide; Kopenhagen 1986
 Nibedom, Nirmal; The Night of the Guerillas; Delhi 1978
 Srikanth, H.; Thomas, C. J.; Naga Resistance Movement and the Peace Process in Northeast India; in: Peace and Democracy in South Asia, Vol. I (2005)
 Terrorism and separatism in North-East India; Delhi 2004;

Notes

References

Works cited

External links 

 "The Other Burma: Conflict, counter-insurgency and human rights in Northeast India"
 Mansi Mehrotra Bodo Uprising
 Sinlung
 Insurgencies in Northeast India:Conflict, Co-option, and Change
 Journal of North East India Studies

Conflicts in 1954
Internal security issues of India
 
Insurgencies in Asia
Islamic terrorism in India
Islamist insurgencies
Northeast India
Proxy wars
Rebellions in India
Separatism in India
Wars involving Bangladesh
Wars involving Bhutan
Wars involving India
Wars involving Myanmar
20th-century conflicts
21st-century conflicts
1950s conflicts
1960s conflicts
1970s conflicts
1980s conflicts
1990s conflicts
2000s conflicts
2010s conflicts
2020s conflicts